Eleonora d'Este may refer to:
Eleonora d'Este (1515–1575), daughter of Alfonso I d'Este and Lucrezia Borgia, nun, and possibly a composer of religious music
Eleonora d'Este (1537–1581), daughter of Ercole II d'Este and Renata di Francia
Eleonora d'Este (1561–1637), daughter of Alfonso d'Este, marquess of Montecchio
Eleonora d'Este (1595–1661), daughter of Cesare d'Este, duke of Modena
Leonora or Eleonora d'Este (1639–1640), daughter of Francesco I d'Este, duke of Modena
Eleonora d'Este (1643–1722), daughter of Francesco I d'Este, duke of Modena